John Charles Groome (June 8, 1800 – November 30, 1866) was Secretary of State of Maryland, appointed by Governor Thomas W. Veazey in 1838.

Biography
He was born in Elkton, Maryland on June 8, 1800 to Doctor John Groome and Elizabeth Black. He graduated from Princeton College then studied law under E.F. Chambers and Levin Gale.  He graduated from Litchfield Law School.  He married Elizabeth Riddle Black on December 6, 1836 and they had five children: James Black Groome, Maria Stokes Groome Knight, Elizabeth Black Groome Constable, Jane S. Groome Black, and John C. Groome II (1839-1860). He died on November 30, 1866 in Elkton, Maryland.

References

|-

Secretaries of State of Maryland
1800 births
1866 deaths
People from Elkton, Maryland
19th-century American politicians